Springfield Township, New Jersey may refer to:

Springfield Township, Burlington County, New Jersey
Springfield Township, Union County, New Jersey

See also
Springfield Township (disambiguation)

New Jersey township disambiguation pages